Millions is a novel published early in 2004, the first book by British screenwriter Frank Cottrell Boyce. It is an adaptation of his screenplay for the film Millions, although it was released six months before the film (September). Set in England just before British adoption of the euro (a fictional event) the story features two boys who must decide what to do with a windfall in expiring currency.

Cottrell Boyce won the annual Carnegie Medal from the British librarians, recognising the year's best children's book published in the UK. Millions was an integral part of the annual Liverpool Reads campaign in his home city.

Awards and nominations
Beside winning the Carnegie Medal from the British librarians, Millions made the shortlists for the Guardian Children's Fiction Prize and the Branford Boase Award.

References

External links 
  —immediately, the first US edition
 "In the Frame for Writing Millions" – an interview with Frank Cottrell Boyce 

2004 British novels
2004 children's books
British children's novels
Carnegie Medal in Literature winning works
Widnes
Novels set in Cheshire
European Union in fiction
Novels by Frank Cottrell-Boyce
Macmillan Publishers books